Tim DeLaughter (born November 18, 1965) is an American rock musician. He is the frontman of the bands Tripping Daisy, The Polyphonic Spree, and Preteen Zenith.

At the 61st Primetime Creative Arts Emmy Awards, DeLaughter was nominated for Outstanding Original Main Title Theme Music for his work on the television series United States of Tara.

Music career
As a teenager, DeLaughter played in various Duncanville bands as a drummer. However, he was poor at the instrument and began teaching himself to sing and play guitar.

Following the death of guitarist Wes Berggren in 1999, Tripping Daisy disbanded. The next year, DeLaughter formed The Polyphonic Spree.

Musical style
Music critic Mike Boehm described DeLaughter's singing style as a "nasally vocal blend of Ozzy Osbourne and Perry Farrell. The Boston Globe'''s Joan Anderman described him as "sounding like Wayne Coyne of the Flaming Lips starring in a stoner production of Godspell''".

Personal life
DeLaughter has no siblings and his parents divorced when he was a child. His grandfather was a Southern Baptist preacher.

DeLaughter and his wife, Julie Doyle, met while they were students at Duncanville High School. Their fourth child was born in December 2006. Doyle is also a member of The Polyphonic Spree.

References

External links
Tim DeLaughter's Twitter
The Polyphonic Spree
Tripping Daisy
Good Records Recordings
Good Records

1965 births
Living people
American male singer-songwriters
Singer-songwriters from Texas
People from Dallas
People from Duncanville, Texas
Duncanville High School alumni
The Polyphonic Spree members